Chvaleč is a municipality and village in Trutnov District in the Hradec Králové Region of the Czech Republic. It has about 600 inhabitants. It is located on the border with Poland.

Administrative parts
The village of Petříkovice is an administrative part of Chvaleč.

References

Villages in Trutnov District